Roza Robota (1921 – 6 January 1945) or Róża Robota in Polish, referred to in other sources as Rojza, Rózia or Rosa, was the leader of a group of four women Holocaust resistors hanged in the Auschwitz concentration camp for their role in the Sonderkommando prisoner revolt of 7 October 1944.

Biography
Born in Ciechanów, Poland, to a middle-class family, Róża had one brother and one sister. She was a member of Hashomer Hatzair Zionist-socialist youth movement, and joined that movement's underground, upon the 1939 Nazi German invasion of Poland. Róża often used her Hebrew name, Shoshanah. In the home of Izajasz (Isaiah) Robota at Żydowska 4 Street in Ciechanów was the Perec Library, the most active Jewish cultural society in the city, organizing discussions about the Polish, Jewish and world literature, as well as theatre performances, lectures, and dances.

Auschwitz
Roza was transported to Auschwitz concentration camp in a Holocaust train during the liquidation of the Ciechanów Ghetto in 1942. She survived the "selection" and was assigned to Auschwitz-II Birkenau labor commando for women, where she got involved in the underground dissemination of news among the prisoners. No one else from her family in Europe is known to have survived. She worked in the clothing depot at the Birkenau Effektenlager adjacent to Crematorium III of Birkenau, where the bodies of gas chamber victims were burned. She had been recruited by men of the underground whom she knew from her hometown, to smuggle "Schwarzpulver" (gunpowder; or dynamite according to other sources) collected by women in the Krupp "Weichsel" munitions factory, and then transferring it to a Sonderkommando man named Wróbel, who was also active in the resistance. This schwartzpulver was used to manufacture primitive grenades to help blow up the crematorium during the Sonderkommando revolt. In her work, she was assisted by Hadassa Zlotnicka and her male counterpart, Godel Silber, both also from Ciechanów, whom Robota apparently enlisted in the resistance. Together with a few other women who worked in the Nazi "pulverraum" factory, they were able to obtain, hide, and turn over to the men of the underground no more than one to three teaspoons of the schwartzpulver compound per day, and not every day. The Sonderkommando blew up Crematorium III on 6 October 1944.

Robota and three other women – Ala Gertner, Ester Wajcblum, and Regina Safirsztajn – were arrested by the Gestapo and tortured in the infamous Bloc 23 but they refused to reveal the names of others who participated in the smuggling operation. They were hanged on 6 January 1945 – two women at the morning roll-call assembly, two others in the evening. Robota was 23 years old. According to some eyewitness accounts, she and her comrades shouted "Nekamah" ("Vengeance!"), or "Be Strong" to the assembled inmates before they died. Some say they shouted, "Chazak V'amatz" – "Be strong and have courage", the Biblical phrase that God uses to encourage Joshua after the death of Moses. This is also the motto of Hashomer Hatzair, the youth organization to which she belonged.

The Sonderkommando Revolt caused some 70 fatalities among the SS and kapos and blew the roof off one crematorium, yet the Nazis knew the advancing Russian Army was very close to liberating the camp. It was clear to the Nazis that all evidence of the war-time atrocities had to be concealed, so the Germans attempted to destroy the other four crematoria themselves.

Legacy
Roza Robota's memory lives on, in the naming of the Roza Robota Gates at Montefiore Randwick (Sydney, Australia). This initiative was made possible by Sam Spitzer, a resistance fighter during World War II and now a resident of Sydney. He named the gates in honour of his war-time hero, Robota, and his late wife, Margaret. Spitzer's sister was in Auschwitz with Robota.

At Yad Vashem in Jerusalem, a monument was built to honor Robota and the three other executed women. It stands in a prime location in the garden.
In the United States, the Rosa Robota Foundation, Inc., a not-for-profit educational organization in New York State has been active in the dissemination of information and has offered audio-visual presentations to student and civic groups since 1994. The Foundation also arranged a fiftieth-anniversary commemoration of the Sonderkommando Revolt at the site of a destroyed crematorium in the Auschwitz Museum.  Another commemorative event is planned to take place in Auschwitz in October, 2023.

References

Sources
 Gurewitsch, Brana. Mothers, Sisters, Resisters: Oral Histories of Women Who Survived the Holocaust, The University of Alabama Press, 1998.
 Shelley, Lore. The Union Kommando in Auschwitz: The Auschwitz Munition Factory Through the Eyes of Its Former Slave Laborers, University Press of America, 1996.

External links
Jewish Women's Archive
Find a Grave entry

1921 births
1945 deaths
Jewish resistance members during the Holocaust
People from Ciechanów
Polish Jews who died in the Holocaust
Polish people who died in Auschwitz concentration camp
Female resistance members of World War II
Date of birth unknown
Polish civilians killed in World War II
Jewish anti-fascists
Polish anti-fascists
Polish torture victims
People executed by Nazi Germany by hanging
Jewish women activists